Velanati Chodas were a dynasty who ruled over parts of the Andhra Pradesh in the 12th century. They were Vassals of Later Cholas and Western Chalukyas and ruled over the region of Kammanadu in modern Guntur district.

During its peak the chiefs also ruled area of Venginadu, the land between Krishna and Godavari rivers. They belonged to the Durjaya family, so they were also called as Durjayas of Velanadu. Rajendra Choda II had assumed the title " Durjayakulaprakasa ".

History

Gonka I ruled as a vassal to Kulothunga I of Later Cholas of Gangaikonda Cholapuram, and his son Mummadi Varma, viceroy of Vengi. He fought as general in the battles against Kalyani Chalukyas and also against refractory vassals, Kalinga and Chakrakuta, who joined with Kalyani Chalukyas. He assumed the title Chola Mula Stambha (The pillar of Chola empire).  His kingdom included the region from Gundlakamma in south to Tripurantakam in West. Rajendra Choda I succeeded his father as the chieftain and continued his allegiance to Later Cholas. He was defeated by Anantapalaya, the general of Vikramaditya VI of Kalyani Chalukyas in 1115 AD.  Rajendra Choda I was forced to accept the suzerainty of Kalyani Chalukyas.

Someswara III succeeded his father Vikramaditya VI in Kalyani in 1126 AD and Rajendra Choda I continued their allegiance to Kalyani Chalukyas. Malla Bhupati of Vengi recovered some regions on the banks of Krishna, but Velanti Chodas remained as subjects of Someswara II in these battles. However, in 1132 AD, he fought along the side of Later Cholas. Vikrama Chola sent his army under his son Kulothunga II to Vengi. Many chieftains including Velandu Chodas joined hands with him and helped in driving out Kalyani Chalukyas in the battle of Manneru.

Rajendra Choda I died in the same year and Gonka II succeeded his father. He was regarded as greatest among of all Chodas and also fought as general in earlier battles during his father reign. He accompanied Kulothunga Chola II in many battles like famous Godavari battle that resulted in recovering all regions from Kalyani Chalukyas.  He crushed many rebel chieftains like Chodas of Nellore and Konidena. His kingdom included the region between Mahendragiri in north and Srisailam in south. Prola II of Kakatiyas attacked his kingdom in 1158 AD. Chodayaraja, chief of Gonaka II killed Prola II and annexed lost regions. Gonaka II assumed many titles like Chalukyarajya MulaStambha.

Decline
While glory of Velanati Chodas continued during the next two kings Rajendra Choda II and Gonka III and although they defeated all rebellions from north and west, they lost control of some regions. Many warriors were slain in the battle of Palanadu between the families of Haihayas, relatives and vassals of Velanati Chodas. The kingdom lost land from Srisailam to Tripurantakam to the Kakatiya king Rudradeva.

The last great king in the dynasty is Pruthviswara. He ruled from Pithapuram and made several attempts to regain land and lost prestige. When kakatiyas were fighting against the Yadavas, he recovered the Velandau. However starting from 1201 AD, he lost to Kakatiyas and their subjects Nellore Chodas and was slain in a battle with Ganapatideva of Kakatiyas in 1207 AD. His son Rajendra Choda III made further attempts and lost entire kingdom to Ganapatideva.

Rulers 
Gonka I	         (1076–1108)
Rajendra Choda I     (1108–1132)
Gonka II	         (1132–1161)
Rajendra Choda I     (1161–1181)
Gonka III	         (1181–1186)
Pruthviswara	 (1186–1207)
Rajendra Choda III   (1207–1216)

Culture 
The region was between Krishna and Godavari rivers.  According to Keyurabahu Charitram, the region witnessed prosperity and plenty. 
According to Palanati Charitra, war sports including cockfighting were popular. It had opulent city markets.

Religion
The region during this period witnessed both Saivism and Vaishnavism. Kings practiced Saivism according to books written about Velandu kings.

References

 South Indian Inscriptions - http://www.whatisindia.com/inscriptions/

Dynasties of India
Empires and kingdoms of India
Chola dynasty
History of Andhra Pradesh